Pol-e Shekasteh or Pol Shekasteh may refer to:
 Pol Shekasteh, Fars
 Pol-e Shekasteh, Asadabad, Hamadan Province
 Pol Shekasteh, Hamadan